Chinese television dramas (Simplified Chinese: 中国电视连续剧), sometimes colloquially known as C-dramas or C-dorama, are television dramas originating from China or the Greater China region. China produces more television dramas than any other country. The most popular genre of dramas in China is fantasy romance, with 47 of the 50 most watched dramas in the country in 2016 being in this genre. Chinese television dramas are popular and regularly broadcast throughout Asia; particularly in Vietnam, Malaysia, Singapore, Thailand, Indonesia, the Philippines, Sri Lanka and Cambodia.

Characteristics 
Since the 1990s, historical serials have been the dominant genre on prime-time television. The trend peaked in the late 1990s and early 2000s, with many palace (also known as "Qing") dramas shown on television.

Popular Chinese television dramas, such as Ashes of Love, Story of Yanxi Palace, Nirvana in Fire, The Journey of Flower, Eternal Love, The Princess Weiyoung, Just One Smile Is Very Alluring, The Legend of Zhen Huan, Scarlet Heart, The Mystic Nine, The Untamed and more often garner billions of views among China's most popular video websites, iQiyi, Youku and Tencent Video. Some dramas have been so popular and widely acclaimed that they were remade in other languages, or were spun off into a sequel.
 
Many series end each episode in a cliffhanger. The channel CCTV-8 airs TV series around the clock. Series are divided into several rough categories: historical (subdivided into historical fiction, nationalist-rallying, historical re-enactment and wuxia, police and politics, comedy, and the more modern family conflict drama genre. Episodes usually begin with opening theme music over credits and end with further theme music and more credits.

The series of episodes runs on together to depict a series of events that happen one after another in relevance to the main plot of the drama. Like a novel, the drama contains characters, conflict, plot, climax, and resolution that intrigue the audience's interest. The large number of episodes allows the plot to be carried in much more detail than in a short movie. A particular aspect of life such as high school, college, or work life of a person, or a specific job is shown with much greater details that allows the audience to acknowledge that particular area in detail. This gives the audience a better understanding of the characters and their perspectives as well as the entirety of the storyline.

Long-form Chinese television series vary in quality, although since the mid to late 2010s, observers have noted a sharp increase in production values and script quality in some series. Also, a number of Chinese television series used music from Hollywood movies as incidental music.

Dramas are generated with a specific genre like romance, comedy, horror, family drama, sports, or a mixture of these in the form of ancient, historical, Republican era or modern to highlight the theme and suits the audience's interest. Chinese-language dramas are often classified by where they were produced, such as mainland dramas, Taiwanese dramas, Hong Kong dramas, and Singaporean dramas. Each differs in the style of filming and editing format. Most consist of romance, family and friends with the combination of pop cultural themes.

Dramas have also been the targets of censorship, with series such as Story of Yanxi Palace and Ruyi's Royal Love in the Palace being cancelled by the Chinese government for not promoting socialist values.

Dubbing 
Chinese dramas are often dubbed, by professional voice actors. It usually takes one month to do the dubbing for 30 to 40 episodes, in post-production. Popular voice actors may dub several series a year, often resulting in drama fans recognizing their voices. There are several reasons why actors would be dubbed in Chinese television dramas. First of all, dramas should be aired using putonghua, the standard Mandarin dialect, and many actors may have an accent, according to which region they come from. To standardize the pronunciation throughout the production, voice actors trained in standard Mandarin are employed in post-production. Filming conditions may also result in poor audio quality and noises, which requires work in post-production. Voice acting is also sometimes used to improve an actor's otherwise poor performance. Censorship may also require changing some lines in post-production.

There are actors who are usually not dubbed, including Hu Ge, Wang Kai, Jin Dong, Jiang Xin and Deng Chao.

See also
 C-pop
 Mandopop
 Cinema of China
 Taiwanese drama
 Hong Kong television drama
 List of Chinese television series

References

See also
 Television in China

 
Television drama
Chinese plays